Vasiliy Ivanovich Pokotilo (Василий Иванович Покотило; 8 August 1856 – 27 March 1919) was Governor general of Russian Turkestan from 1910 to 1911.

1856 births
1919 deaths
Imperial Russian Army generals
Governors-general
Politicians of the Russian Empire
Atamans